Igreja Paroquial de Santo Aleixo da Restauração is a church in Portugal. It is classified as a National Monument.

Churches in Beja District
National monuments in Beja District